Bo Axel Magnus Lundgren (born 11 July 1947) is a Swedish politician. He was the leader of the Moderate Party from 1999 to 2003.

Lundgren served as Minister for Fiscal and Financial Affairs from 1991 to 1994 in the government of Carl Bildt, with responsibility mainly for financial markets, taxation and housing. The country faced a severe financial crisis after the bursting of a speculation bubble which had developed in the 1980s. The Swedish government's management of the crisis attracted international attention, especially after the late 2000s recession. Lundgren testified to the US Congressional Oversight Panel in 2009 and was also called to the European Parliament and the Irish Parliament to speak about management of financial crises.

In 1999, he succeeded Carl Bildt as party leader and became leader of the opposition. He resigned four years later after the party's poor results in the Swedish parliamentary election in 2002. He was succeeded by Fredrik Reinfeldt, who would move the party to the political centre. He then served as director general of the Swedish National Debt Office (Riksgäldskontoret) from 2004 to 2013. He played a further role in the government's response to the late 2000s recession, along with Stefan Ingves the head of Sveriges Riksbank, which included the nationalisation of Carnegie Investment Bank. After leaving the Debt Office, he was appointed chairman of Sparbanken Öresund as well as of some other institutions. 

Lundgren earned a degree in business and administration from Lund University in 1972. He received an honorary doctorate from Lund University in 2010.

Currently, he is on the advisory board of OMFIF where he is regularly involved in meetings regarding the financial and monetary system.

References

1947 births
Living people
People from Kristianstad Municipality
Leaders of the Moderate Party
Recipients of the Order of the Cross of Terra Mariana, 3rd Class
Members of the Andra kammaren
Members of the Riksdag 2002–2006